Žihle is a municipality and village in Plzeň-North District in the Plzeň Region of the Czech Republic. It has about 1,300 inhabitants.

Administrative parts
Villages of Hluboká, Kalec, Nový Dvůr, Odlezly and Přehořov are administrative parts of Žihle.

References

Villages in Plzeň-North District